The Crowsoniellidae are a monotypic family of beetles, in the suborder Archostemata. So far, only a single species, Crowsoniella relicta, has been attributed to this family. Known only from three male specimens collected in 1973 in Italy by Roberto Pace. In a degraded pasture, the beetles were found among the roots of a large hawthorn tree, in deep calcareous soil. No other specimens have been found since.

At only  in length, this species is comparatively small for this suborder. They also feature several unusual morphological features such as missing alae, modified and reduced mouth parts, and smooth elytra (lacking window punctures characteristic of this suborder). Nothing is known about this species biology.

References

Archostemata
Monotypic Archostemata genera
Endemic fauna of Italy